Customer Acquisition Cost (CAC) is the cost of winning a customer to purchase a product or service. As an important unit economic, customer acquisition costs are often related to customer lifetime value (CLV or LTV). 

With CAC, any company can gauge how much they’re spending on acquiring each customer. It shows the money spent on marketing, salaries, and other things to acquire a customer.
Keep an eye on CAC so it doesn’t get out of control. For example, no rational company would spend $500 to acquire a new customer with an expected LTV of $300 because it would drain $200 of value per customer acquired. 

CAC, combined with LTV is a frequently compared metric, particularly for SaaS companies. They can manage their expenses, see their growth, predict their future moves, and expand if the business allows.

Calculating Customer Acquisition Costs
There is a simple and complex method for calculating acquisition costs.

Simple Method
The simple method divides the total marketing costs to acquire new customers by the total number of customers acquired in a defined period.

 CAC = Customer Acquisition Cost 
 MCC = total marketing cost for acquiring customers (not regular customers)
 CA = total customers acquired 

Complex Method
In addition to the costs incurred in marketing, the complex method includes sales and marketing wages, software costs for sales and marketing, all additional professional services such as designers, consultants, etc., as well as other overhead costs.

 CAC = Customer Acquisition Cost 
 MCC = total marketing cost for acquiring customers (not regular customers)
 W = wages connected with sales and marketing 
 S = all the marketing and sales associated software cost (inc. E-Commerce-Platform, automated marketing, A / B-testing, analytics etc.)
 PS = every additional professional service in marketing / sales (Designer, consultant, etc.)
 O = other overheads associated with marketing and sales
 CA = total customers acquired

Customer acquisition costs in relation to customer lifetime value
Customer lifetime value expresses the monetary value that a customer is worth to the company in the course of a customer relationship. If the ratio of LTV to CAC is now calculated, different values can result. 
 1:1 The company loses money (if we take the cost of providing the service into account)
 less than 1:1 The company gets into financial difficulties because more is paid for customers than they are worth. 
 3:1 is a very good level because the customer relationships are solid and customers are acquired for the right price. 
 higher than 3:1 means the company has untapped growth potential to acquire customers.

Customer acquisition costs in the environment of start-ups and venture capital
In the approach and review phase of venture capital companies to start-ups, the CAC and LTV ratios can be of great importance depending on what type of market or product is produced.

See also
 Customer acquisition management
 Customer lifecycle management
 Performance metric
 Controlling
 Marketing
 Sales
 Venture capital
 Software as a service (SaaS)

References

 
 

 
 
 
 
 
 Rotem, Eran (2021-08-31). "customer acquisition cost (cac) - a management concept worth knowing". All about the terms CAC, CLV, ROI, TCO, MAC, SAC. Adcore. 

 

Specific

Marketing analytics
Sales